The Black Horse is a Grade II listed public house at High Road, Eastcote, in the London Borough of Hillingdon.
It was built in the early 19th century.

References

Grade II listed buildings in the London Borough of Hillingdon
Grade II listed pubs in London
Eastcote
Pubs in the London Borough of Hillingdon